Elsie Widdowson  (21 October 1906 – 14 June 2000), was a British dietitian and nutritionist. She and Dr Robert McCance, a pediatrician, physiologist, biochemist, and nutritionist, were responsible for overseeing the government-mandated addition of vitamins to food and wartime rationing in Britain during World War II.

Early life
Widdowson was born in Wallington, Surrey on 21 October 1906 to Rose Elphick and Harry Widdowson. Her father, Thomas Henry (known as Harry), was from Grantham in Lincolnshire and moved to Battersea as a grocer's assistant and eventually owned a stationery business, whilst her mother Rose, originally from Dorking, worked as a dressmaker. Her younger sister Eva Crane trained as a nuclear physicist but became a world-renowned authority on bees. The family were Plymouth Brethren.

Elsie lived in Dulwich as a child and attended Sydenham County Grammar School for Girls where both she and her sister won prizes. During the 1920s and 1930s, professional opportunities for women, apart from nursing or teaching, were limited. Educated women such as Widdowson had to develop skills that offered employment potential; therefore, Widdowson trained as a chemist.

She studied chemistry at Imperial College, London and although she completed her degree in two year, she had to wait until 1928 to be awarded her BSc, when she became one of the first women graduates of Imperial College. She did postgraduate work at the Department of Plant Physiology at Imperial College, developing methods for separating and measuring the fructose, glucose, sucrose, and hemicellulose of fruit. She would measure individual changes in the carbohydrates in fruit from the time it appeared on the tree to when it ripened. Once a fortnight, she took a train to Kentish apple orchard and picked apples, measuring their carbohydrate levels. In 1931, she received her PhD in chemistry from the Imperial College for her thesis on the carbohydrate content of apples. This work would go on to have international impact. She started work in the university’s department of plant physiology.

While her early studies are primarily plant-based, Widdowson was much more interested in the biochemistry of animals and humans. She did further research with Professor Charles Dodds at the Courtauld Institute of Biochemistry at Middlesex Hospital, on the metabolism of the kidneys, and also received a doctorate from the Courtauld Institute.

McCance and Widdowson

Although Widdowson had attained a doctoral degree from a prestigious institution, she was still struggling to find a long-term position. Dr. Dodds suggested that Widdowson consider specializing in dietetics, so she started a postgraduate diploma at King's College, London. She learned about the compositions of meat and fish and how cooking affected them.

Widdowson met Robert McCance in the kitchens at King's College Hospital in 1933, when she was studying industrial cooking techniques as part of her diploma on dietetics. McCance was a junior doctor researching the chemical effects of cooking as part of his clinical research on the treatment of diabetes. Widdowson pointed out an error in McCance's analysis of the fructose content of fruit, based on her PhD research. Instead of being offended, McCance obtained a grant for Widdowson to analyze and correct all previous data. From there on they became scientific partners and worked together for the next 60 years, until McCance died in 1993. A few years after the first grant, McCance obtained a second grant for Widdowson to continue working on the food composition of fruits, vegetables, and nuts.

McCance became a Reader in Medicine at Cambridge University in 1938, and Widdowson joined his team at the Department of Experimental Medicine in Cambridge. They worked on the chemical composition of the human body, and on the nutritional value of different flours used to make bread.  Widdowson also studied the impact of infant diet on human growth. They studied the differing effects from deficiencies of salt and of water, and produced the first tables to compare the different nutritional content of foods before and after cooking.  Their work became of national importance during the Second World War.  Widdowson and McCance were co-authors of The Chemical Composition of Foods, first published in 1940 by the Medical Research Council (MRC). Their book "McCance and Widdowson" became known as the dietician's bible and formed the basis for modern nutritional thinking.

As WWII progressed, the blockade on most food tightened. Essential foods such as butter, meat, cheese, fish, and eggs became very limited. Widdowson and McCance became concerned for the health effects such an extreme rationing system would cause. Widdowson and McCance and their colleagues became their own experimental subjects. The two would put themselves on a starvation diet, coupled with rigorous exercise such as climbing mountains and burning almost 5,000 calories (the healthy amount of calories to burn per day for a woman is about 2,500). Then, they would put themselves on their developed diet of bread, cabbage and potatoes for several months to find out if wartime rationing—with little meat, dairy or calcium intake—would affect their health.  They showed that good health could be supported by this very restricted diet. They were also the first to advocate for the fortification of food, specifically bread, with vitamins and minerals such as calcium. Their work became the basis of the wartime austerity diet promoted by the Minister of Food Lord Woolton.

Widdowson and McCance headed the first mandated addition of vitamins and minerals to food.  Their work began in the early 1940s, when calcium was added to bread. They were also responsible for formulating the wartime rationing of Britain during World War II.

Widdowson and McCance were employed by the Medical Research Council from 1946, and spent most of their working life in Cambridge.   They were consulted on the rehabilitation of the victims of severe starvation in Nazi concentration camps, and visited the Netherlands, Germany and Denmark in early 1946 to study of the impact of the poor wartime diet on the people in Nazi-occupied territories.  Widdowson followed up this work in the 1950s, 1960s and 1970s by studying malnourishment in Africa.  Research on animals showed that malnourishment in early life led to lifelong effects on growth and health.

Widdowson showed that a newborn human infant has 16 per cent of its weight as fat, much greater than the one or two per cent of other species.  She also studied the importance of the nutritional content of infant diets, particularly trace vitamins and minerals in natural and artificial human milk.  Her work led to revised standards for breast milk substitutes in the UK in the 1980s.

Later life and honours
Widdowson became head of the Infant Nutrition Research Division at the Dunn Nutritional Laboratory in Cambridge in 1966.  She formally retired in 1972, but continued academic research in the Department of Investigative Medicine at Addenbrooke's Hospital.  She was president of the Nutrition Society from 1977 to 1980, president of the Neonatal Society from 1978 to 1981, and president of the British Nutrition Foundation from 1986 to 1996. She became a Fellow of Imperial College in 1994.

She became a Fellow of the Royal Society in 1976 and was appointed a CBE in 1979.  She was made a member of the Order of the Companions of Honour in 1993, which is awarded for outstanding achievements in the arts, literature, music, science, politics, industry, or religion.

The British Nutrition Foundation published a book in 1993 to celebrate 60 years of her partnership with McCance, McCance & Widdowson: A Scientific Partnership of 60 Years, 1933–1993.

Widdowson lived in Barrington near Cambridge for over 50 years.  She ate a simple diet, including butter and eggs, and attributed her longevity to good genes: her father lived to 96 and her mother to 107.  She died at Addenbrooke's Hospital after suffering a stroke while on holiday with her sister in Ireland.  She never married.

Legacy
In 2020, she was included by the BBC in a list of seven important but little-known British female scientists.

Imperial College offers the Elsie Widdowson Fellowship for academic staff returning to work following maternity, adoption and/or shared parental leave.

In 2009 a Chemical Landmark Plaque, the Royal Society of Chemistry's (RSC) national award recognising a site of historic significance in science, was awarded at the Elsie Widdowson Laboratory on Fulbourn Road, Cambridge, former home of MRC Human Nutrition Research. 

In 2021 a blue plaque was unveiled in her honour at a former bakery near to her home in Barrington, where the bread which she had used for her studies had been made. It was funded by The Nutrition Society, the British Dietetic Association and the British Nutrition Foundation.

References

External links

 Obituary, The Daily Telegraph, 22 June 2000 
 Obituary, The Guardian, 22 June 2000
 Obituary, The Economist, 29 June 2000 
 
 Dr. Elsie Widdowson CH, CBE, FRS, MRC Human Nutrition Research
 The Elsie Widdowson Lecture, The Neonatal Society
 Obituary: Elsie Widdowson (1906–2000), Nature 406, 844 (24 August 2000)
 A personal appreciation: Dr Elsie M. Widdowson, 22 October 1906–14 June 2000, Proceedings of the Nutrition Society, Volume 60, Issue 02, May 2001, pp 157–160
 Great Lives: Helen Sharman on Elsie Widdowson on Radio 4
Dr Elsie Widdowson CH FRS in interview with Sir Gordon Wolstenholme (video) - recorded by Oxford Brookes University in partnership with the Royal College of Physicians as part of the Medical Sciences Video Archive.

1906 births
2000 deaths
Alumni of Imperial College London
Alumni of King's College London
Dietitians
Members of the Order of the Companions of Honour
Female Fellows of the Royal Society
British women chemists
People from Wallington, London
Commanders of the Order of the British Empire
Women food scientists
Fellows of the Royal Society
20th-century British women scientists
Diet food advocates
Recipients of the James Spence Medal